MarsCon is the name of two separate, unaffiliated science fiction conventions:

MarsCon (Williamsburg, Virginia)
MarsCon (Bloomington, Minnesota)

See also
Marcon (convention), a science fiction convention held annually in Columbus, Ohio